Casa Linda Estates, or simply Casa Linda is a neighborhood in east Dallas, Texas (USA). It is situated to the south and east of White Rock Lake and to the south of Garland Road (SH 78). It is in Dallas Council District 9.

The neighborhood features half acre and larger, tree-lined estates along winding roads. Residents are in close proximity to White Rock Lake, the Bath House Cultural Center, the Dallas Arboretum, and  Casa Linda Shopping Center.

History

The area was known as Ola and Reinhardt prior to redevelopment as Casa Linda. Dallas annexed Reinhardt in 1948.

The 640-acre area was purchased by Carl Martin Brown and his wife Ida May James Brown on January 1, 1933, with a mortgage given in the amount of $5333.48 at 7% interest to the  Chenault family that owned the land at that time.

In 1937, Carl had a full title search done of the land and found it had originally been awarded to Richardson Scurry for his participation in The Battle of San Jacinto. Mr Scurry was not allowed to sell, so upon his death it was sold for 1,000.00 dollars by his attorney in fact to another  W, Heedle. Over the course of 100 years the land it went from owner to owner till it ended up in Carl's hands.

Carl had his son Howard farmed the land till the money could be saved and raised to start putting in street, electricity and city water.  Home building and the Casa Linda Plaza Shopping Center then had a base to be built from.  Casa Linda Theatre was the first building completed after World War II. All the deed restrictions were placed in 1939 to make the area a first class neighborhood for white families. The deed restrictions for Casa Linda Estates (Section 1, part 1) included "said premises shall be used for private dwelling purposes and by white persons only, not excluding bona fide servants of any race;" The homes were  effectively built out by1960 by land owner, Carl Martin Brown and his oldest son, Howard D. Brown and Corinne Brown Walton, Carl's daughter.  They joined forces to make the area known as Casa Linda their lifetime work and greatest achievement.

The Browns turned their family farm into homes called Casa Linda Estates and a shopping center called Casa Linda Plaza, though a few vacant lots remained until the early 1960s for future homes and the last store to be built in Casa Linda Plaza was a Kroger grocery built in 1971. The architectural styles of the homes vary, and some excellent examples of Spanish Colonial Revival Style architecture can be found in the area and also the shopping center.  Howard D. Brown loved the Spanish language and named all the streets using Spanish words. The area is heavily treed, and most homes display well-kept and in some cases elaborate landscaping, many have servants quarters built in the back of the property that today can be used for rentals or guest accommodations. The Brown Family created a place where all items for every day needs could be purchased in Casa Linda Plaza with schools and fire house near by.  The Brown family owned the shopping center till Howard D. Brown decided to sell in late 1978 due to leukemia.  Howard Brown's daughter, Beverly Ann Brown Heart, was a home builder in Dallas, Richardson, Garland and Rockwall Texas, continuing till the mid 1980s the family tradition of building. As of  2015 Casa Linda is still going strong with new tenants like Chili's restaurant along with old tenants like El Fenix Restaurant that has been there since mid 1950s.

References

External links 
HomeSourceDallas - Casa Linda Estates
Casa Linda Estates Neighborhood Association
Information Regarding a Proposed Zoning Change (2007) for Casa Linda Estates